The Sadmind worm was a computer worm which exploited vulnerabilities in both Sun Microsystems' Solaris (Security Bulletin 00191) and Microsoft's Internet Information Services (MS00-078), for which a patch had been made available seven months earlier. It was discovered on 
May 8, 2001. 

fuck USA Governmentfuck PoizonBOxcontact:@yahoo.com.cn
Message displayed on sites altered by Sadmind worm.
The worm defaced web servers with a message against the United States government and the anti-Chinese cracking group PoizonBOx.

Systems affected by version
Microsoft (IIS):
 Version 4.0
 Version 5.0
Sun Microsystems  (Solaris):
 Version 2.3
 Version 2.4

See also
 Timeline of computer viruses and worms
 Comparison of computer viruses
 Computer viruses

References

External links
CERT Advisory CA-2001-11
CERT Vulnerability Note VU#28934 
Symantec Rates Sadmind/IIS Worm a One In Severity - Risk Impact of Security Vulnerability Resulting From Worm Exploit Rated as High
Solaris Worm Attacks IIS Servers

Exploit-based worms